Queralt is a female given name from Catalan. Notable people with the name include:

Queralt Casas (born 1992), Spanish basketball player
Queralt Castellet (born 1989), Spanish snowboarder

Catalan feminine given names